Rusi Kanda Poonai is a Tamil-language drama film directed by G. N. Rangarajan. The film stars Saritha, Sudhakar and M. R. R. Vasu. It was released on 25 December 1980.

Plot 
Rusi Kanda Poonai is a gripping emotional story of Savithri and Ramesh, played by Saritha and Sudhakar respectively.

Saritha and Sudhakar love each other and Ramesh promises her that he will marry Saritha. but later it is revealed that Sudhakar has already married and dejected, Saritha leaves the hostel run by Manorama and her Siddha expert husband Suruli Rajan, for her hometown. In fact, Sudhakar's marital life was a disaster as they often have quarrels. Eager to meet Saritha, Sudhakar comes to the hostel, but she has already left. Saritha becomes pregnant and delivers a baby girl and meanwhile, Sudhakar's wife, Y. Vijaya dies in an accident. Saritha was never informed about the delivery of her baby girl and her mother gives the child to the greedy couple M. R. R. Vasu and Ganthimathi and both always torture the girl, also blackmail Saritha's mother for money to hide the truth of Saritha's daughter's birth. Saritha gets married and have a happy life blessed with a daughter. Meanwhile, Sudhakar is in search of Saritha and one day meets her at beach as her daughter gets almost drowned, but saved by him. Saritha avoids speaking with Sudhakar. Meanwhile, M. R. Radha blackmails Saritha's mother for money and unable to handle the pressure, she dies revealing the truth to Saritha's daughter. What will happen to Sudhakar, will Saritha's husband finds out the truth and what happens to M. R. Radha gets revealed in the climax.

Cast 
 Saritha
 Sudhakar
 Vijay Babu
 M. R. R. Vasu
 Ganthimathi
 Y. Vijaya
 Manorama
 Suruli Rajan

Soundtrack 
The highly successful soundtrack was composed by Ilaiyaraaja and sung by S. Janaki, P. Susheela and Ilaiyaraaja himself. Lyrics written by Panchu Arunachalam, Gangai Amaran and S. Janaki.

References

External links 
 

1980 films
1980s Tamil-language films
Films directed by G. N. Rangarajan
Films scored by Ilaiyaraaja
Films with screenplays by Panchu Arunachalam
Indian drama films